Bines Green is a hamlet in the Horsham District of West Sussex, England.

The western River Adur flows through the hamlet. Bines Bridge, just north of Bines Green, marks the limit of tidal waters flowing up the western Adur.

References

Villages in West Sussex